Nordfriedhof is a cemetery in Cologne, Germany. Opened on 18 May 1896 and after the Second World War the cemetery was significantly expanded.  German actress Trude Herr (1927–1991) is buried there.

References

External links
 

Cemeteries in Cologne